The cycling events of the 1967 Mediterranean Games were in Tunis, Tunisia.

Medalists

Road cycling

Medal table

References
1967 Mediterranean Games report at the International Committee of Mediterranean Games (CIJM) website
List of Olympians who won medals at the Mediterranean Games at Olympedia.org

Mediterranean Games
Sports at the 1967 Mediterranean Games
1967